HMS Phoebe may refer to:

 , 36, a fifth-rate frigate launched in 1795.
 , 51, a fourth-rate frigate launched in 1854.
 , a  second class cruiser launched in 1890.
 , an  launched in 1916.
 , a  light cruiser launched in 1939.
 , a  launched in 1964. The ship played the fictional HMS Hero (F42) in the 1970s Warship BBC television drama series.

References

Royal Navy ship names